The North Star was a named night train, train #21, 1947–1962, of the New York Central Railroad (NYC) that went from Grand Central Terminal of New York City to Union Terminal of Cleveland, Ohio. It was distinctive in the history of the New York Central's history of service to the North Country of New York State, because it was the longest lasting train in the NYC's later decades that hosted sleeping cars that went continuous from New York City to Lake Placid in the Adirondacks. Predecessor trains in the pre-World War II period carrying direct sleeping cars to the Adirondacks included the Niagara (#29) and the Ontarian (#21 in 1941).

History

In its debut season in April, 1947 it featured coaches that went daily from New York City separately to Cleveland, Toronto and Lake Placid, in addition to sleeper cars that went to each of these destinations. The train's cars to Cleveland and Toronto would split off in Buffalo's Buffalo Central Terminal, and the cars to Lake Placid would split off at Utica's Union Station. In subsequent years, the main default portion of the train would alternatively terminate at Cleveland or Buffalo, yet, the sleeper service continued to the three cities. Coach passengers would need to change to a connecting Adirondack Division train in Utica. At Albany Union Station: sleeper units would join the Delaware and Hudson Railway's unnamed #7 (a local train that left earlier in the evening than the D&H's Montreal Limited) on the D&H's line along the eastern edge of the Adirondacks to Plattsburg and Montreal. 

In the train's summer seasons in its early years a high proportion of the sleeping cars were Lake Placid-bound. In addition to Lake Placid-bound sleepers, in some seasons, such as summer 1951, the sleeper destinations included Malone, a destination further north in the North Country, along the NYC's traditional route towards Montreal. By April, 1953, the NYC dropped the direct New York - Lake Placid coach from the different coach destinations of the North Star.

New York City-bound counterpart
For most years of the North Star service, the returning Lake Placid to New York City sleeping car service would join the east- and south-bound train, the New York Special (#44) at Utica.

Demise
By 1956, the train was cut to a single Saturday night departure. The Cleveland Limited (#57) handled the west and north-bound sleeper trains on the Adirondack route on other nights.

Beginning in 1959, the NYC would continue the tradition of sleeper service to Lake Placid on its Iroquois train (#35). The North Star would have its last appearance as a named train in summer, 1962; however, it continued briefly as unnamed #21.

The Iroquois continued direct sleeper service to Lake Placid to at least the fall 1964 timetable. The NYC ran its final passenger train on the Adirondack Division route on April 24, 1965.

References

International named passenger trains
New York Central Railroad
Named passenger trains of Canada
Named passenger trains of Ontario
Named passenger trains of the United States
Night trains of Canada
Night trains of the United States
Passenger rail transportation in Pennsylvania
Passenger rail transportation in New York (state)
Passenger rail transportation in Ohio
Railway services introduced in 1947
Railway services discontinued in 1962